Buchenkamp is a station in Volksdorf on the Großhansdorf branch of Hamburg U-Bahn line U1. It is the last station on the Großhansdorf branch that is within the city of Hamburg, as the Schleswig-Holstein state line is shortly after the east end of the platform.

History
The station was built in 1914 based on schematics by Eugen Göbel, and opened in 1921, with only one track, as the second track was taken apart in order to obtain material to build a third rail for the electrification of the line. The second track was rebuilt in 1935.

Services
Buchenkamp is served by Hamburg U-Bahn line U1.

References

Hamburg U-Bahn stations in Hamburg
Buildings and structures in Wandsbek
U1 (Hamburg U-Bahn) stations
Railway stations in Germany opened in 1921
Railway stations in Germany opened in 1914